Paddy Logan may refer to:

 Paddy Logan (footballer) (1877–1957), Scottish footballer
 Paddy Logan (politician) (1845–1925), British member of parliament